The 2021 World Series of Poker Europe was the 12th edition of the series of poker tournaments. It took place from November 19-December 8 at King's Casino in Rozvadov, Czech Republic and featured 15 WSOP bracelet events.

On November 25, the Czech government declared a state of emergency as a result of rising COVID-19 cases in the country. The WSOP Europe proceeded as planned, but all events had to conclude by 10 p.m. local time to comply with curfew restrictions.

Event schedule

Source:

Main Event
The €10,350 No-Limit Hold'em Main Event began on December 3 with the first of two starting flights. The event drew 688 entries, the largest Main Event field in WSOP Europe history. The final table was played on December 8, with the winner earning €1,276,712.

Final Table

*-Career statistics prior to the beginning of the 2021 WSOPE Main Event

Final Table results

References

External links
Hendon Mob results

World Series of Poker Europe
2021 in poker